"Obey" is a song by British rock band Bring Me the Horizon and English singer Yungblud. Produced by the band's vocalist Oliver Sykes and keyboardist Jordan Fish, it was released as the third single from the group's 2020 commercial release Post Human: Survival Horror on 2 September 2020.

"Obey" was voted as Annie Mac's "Hottest Record of the Year" in 2020.

Promotion and release
In May 2020, Yungblud tweeted out a cryptic tweet asking Oliver Sykes and Jordan Fish to check their inboxes. This led to a lot of speculation and teasing of a collaboration between the band and the singer. Sykes later revealed that the band and Yungblud "have something coming". The track was then officially teased when Sykes posted a QR code leading to a website with a snippet of the music video.

Within a week until the song's release, both of the artists revealed promotional pictures for the collaboration which pictured Sykes and Yungblud being half naked and covered in blood, that would feature a caption that said "u ain't ready".

Composition and lyrics
"Obey" has been described as a "massive, genre-bending call-to-arms" industrial metal, nu metal, alternative metal, electronic metal, pop metal, pop punk and a hard rock song, including elements of electronic dance music and rave music. It was written and composed by Oliver Sykes, Jordan Fish and Yungblud during quarantine times for the COVID-19 pandemic. The lyrics talk about the oppression that people suffer because of world leaders and politicians. It is written mostly from the point of view of the oppressor, as Sykes told Forbes:

Music video
The music video for "Obey" was released on the same day as the single. Directed by Sykes himself, the video features two giant robots which look like a Power Ranger/Transformer hybrid, that are both controlled by Sykes and Yungblud. Before confronting, the two robots dance and then engage in a fight where the robot controlled by Yungblud knocks the other robot down. When the robot controlled by Sykes gets up, they both seem to lose control of their respective robots who then make out with each other and then stroll off into the sunset.

The song surpassed 1 million views within the first 24 hours after premiering on YouTube. In its first week, the video for the song reached 4.4 million views.

Personnel
Credits adapted from Tidal.

Bring Me the Horizon
 Oliver Sykes – lead vocals, production, engineering
 Lee Malia – guitars
 Jordan Fish – keyboards, programming, percussion, backing vocals, production, engineering
 Matt Kean – bass
 Matt Nicholls – drums

Additional personnel

 Yungblud – vocals
 Mick Gordon – percussion, synthesiser, additional production
 Jordan Baggs – backing vocals
 Luke Burywood – backing vocals
 Clayton Deakin – backing vocals
 Tom Millar – backing vocals
 Giles Stelfox – backing vocals
 Sam Winfield – backing vocals
 Chris Athens – mastering
 Zakk Cervini – mixing, recording
 Carl Brown – recording

In popular culture 
In 2021, "Obey" was used as the theme song for WWE's NXT TakeOver: Vengeance Day PPV.

Charts

Certifications

References

2020 singles
2020 songs
Bring Me the Horizon songs
Yungblud songs
Songs written by Oliver Sykes
RCA Records singles
Sony Music singles
Nu metal songs
Songs about the COVID-19 pandemic